Ercole Rangoni (died 13 February 1650) was a Roman Catholic prelate who served as Archbishop of Conza (1645–1650) and Bishop of Sant'Angelo dei Lombardi e Bisaccia (1622–1645).

Biography
On 2 May 1622, Ercole Rangoni was appointed during the papacy of Pope Gregory XV as Bishop of Sant'Angelo dei Lombardi e Bisaccia.
On 17 May 1622, he was consecrated bishop by Maffeo Barberini, Cardinal-Priest of Sant'Onofrio, with Cosimo de' Bardi, Bishop of Carpentras, and Aloysius Galli, Bishop of Ancona e Numana, serving as co-consecrators. 
On 24 April 1645, he was appointed during the papacy of Pope Innocent X as Archbishop of Conza.
He served as Archbishop of Conza until his death on 13 February 1650.

See also 
Catholic Church in Italy

References

External links and additional sources
 (for Chronology of Bishops) 
 (for Chronology of Bishops) 

17th-century Italian Roman Catholic archbishops
Bishops appointed by Pope Gregory XV
Bishops appointed by Pope Innocent X
1650 deaths
Archbishops of Sant'Angelo dei Lombardi-Conza-Nusco-Bisaccia